Bomba is a surname. Notable people with the surname include:

Andreas Bomba, German journalist and festival director
Enrico Bomba (born 1922), Italian film producer, director and screenwriter
Jozef Bomba (1939–2005), Slovak footballer
Nicky Bomba (born 1963), Australian musician and singer
Ray Bomba (1907–1986), American sound editor
Ty Bomba, American wargame designer

See also 

Flash Bomba
Bomba (disambiguation)
La Bomba (disambiguation)